Valeriu Bularca (14 February 1931 – 7 February 2017) was a Greco-Roman wrestler from Romania. He competed at the 1960 and 1964 Olympics and won a silver medal in 1964. In 1961 he became the first Romanian wrestler to win a world title. Domestically he collected six national titles between 1957 and 1964. After retiring from competitions he worked as a wrestling coach at CS Steagu Roșu in Brașov.

He died in Brașov on 7 February 2017.

References

External links
 

1931 births
2017 deaths
Olympic wrestlers of Romania
Wrestlers at the 1960 Summer Olympics
Wrestlers at the 1964 Summer Olympics
Romanian male sport wrestlers
Olympic silver medalists for Romania
Olympic medalists in wrestling
Medalists at the 1964 Summer Olympics
World Wrestling Championships medalists
People from Covasna County